K. K. Raina is an Indian film, television and theatre character actor and award-winning script writer, who is best known for his roles as Juror #8 in the 1986 film Ek Ruka Hua Faisla, a remake of 12 Angry Men, and Byomkesh Bakshi's associate Ajit Kumar Banerji in the 1993 Doordarshan detective series Byomkesh Bakshi. Raina won the Filmfare Award for Best Dialogue in 1998 for the Rajkumar Santoshi film China Gate.

Life and career
Raina was born in a Kashmiri family in Srinagar, Jammu and Kashmir, India. Raina is an alumnus of the National School of Drama, graduating college in 1976. He portrayed Manohar J. Pherwani in the Sony LIV series Scam 1992.

Filmography

Actor 

 Vijeta (1982) – Wilson
 Aadharshila (1982)
 Gandhi (1982) – Nehru's Friend
 Mandi (1983)
 Godam (1983) – Edekar
 Ardh Satya (1983)
 Tasveer Apni Apni (1984) – Employee
 Party (1984) – Bharat
 Aghaat (1985)
 Nasoor (1985) – Kamlesh Pai
 Trikal (1985) – Senor Lucio (Anna's father)
 Ek Ruka Hua Faisla (1986) – Juror #8
 Susman (1987)
 Mohre (1987) – Prakash Raikar
 Diksha (1991) – Shrikar Upadhyay
 Lifeline (1991) (TV series)
 Suraj Ka Satvan Ghoda (1993)
 Damini (1993) – Shekhar's friend
 Byomkesh Bakshi (1993) (TV series) – Ajit
 Ghatak: Lethal (1996) – Shiv Nath
 Dahek (1998) – Naseem Bahkshi
 Aks (2001) – Mahadevan Ghatge
 Bub (Father) (2001) – Shiban Lal
 Rang De Basanti (2006) – Politician
 Salaam-E-Ishq (2007)
 Dharm (2007) – Thakur
 Phoonk (2008) – Dr. Pandey
 Hijack (2008) – Rasheed Omar
 Delhi-6 (2009) – Haji Suleiman
 Rann (2010) – Prime Minister Digvijay Hooda
 Tanu Weds Manu (2011) – Kishan Sharma (Manu's father)
 Upanishad Ganga (2012–2013) (Doordarshan) (Various Characters)
 Bhaag Milkha Bhaag (2013) - Mr. Wadhwa
 D-Day (2013) - Gen. Razzak
 Zed Plus (2014) - Mr. Dixit
 Samvidhaan (2014) (TV series) - K.M. Munshi
 Tanu Weds Manu Returns (2015) - Kishan Sharma (Manu's father)
 Mirzya (2016) - Karan's father
 Shaadi Mein Zaroor Aana (2017) - Jugal Kishore Mishra (Sattu's father)
 Genius (2018) - Mr.Das
 Pati Patni Aur Woh (2019)
 Scam 1992 (2020) - Manohar J. Pherwani

Writer 
 Ghatak: Lethal (1996) – associate screenplay
 China Gate (1998) – screenplay; dialogues
 Dahek (1998) – screenplay
 Pukar (2000) – dialogues

References

External links 
 

National School of Drama alumni
Indian male film actors
Indian male television actors
Indian male stage actors
Indian theatre directors
Living people
Hindi theatre
20th-century Indian dramatists and playwrights
20th-century Indian male actors
20th-century Indian women
20th-century Indian people
21st-century Indian male actors
Kashmiri actors
People from Srinagar
Year of birth missing (living people)